National Route 257 is a national highway of Japan connecting Nishi-ku, Hamamatsu and Takayama, Gifu in Japan, with a total length of .

Route description
A section of National Route 257 in the city of Toyota in Aichi Prefecture is a musical road.

See also

References

National highways in Japan
Roads in Aichi Prefecture
Roads in Gifu Prefecture
Roads in Shizuoka Prefecture
Musical roads in Japan